Twelvepole Creek is a  river located in Wayne County, West Virginia.  It is part of the Mississippi River watershed, by way of the Ohio River. It is alternately known as Twelve Pole Creek.

Course
Twelvepole Creek rises in northern Mingo County before flowing north through Wayne County.  The headwaters of the East Fork are dammed to form East Lynn Lake.  The East Fork of the river then flows north through East Lynn, Wayne, and Lavalette.  The West Fork flows north through Dunlow, West Virginia and joins the East Fork at the town of Wayne.  The river then flows north again before draining into the Ohio River just east of Ceredo.

Origin of name

Twelvepole Creek received its name from early explorers, the group supposedly included a young George Washington. Traveling the Ohio River, they measured the mouth of the creek where it joined the Ohio in terms of poles, also known as rods. Being approximately 198 feet (12 poles) wide at its mouth, the creek was named Twelvepole Creek.

Recreation

East Lynn Lake and Beech Fork Lake (formed from one of Twelvepole Creek's tributaries) provide popular destinations for boating, fishing, swimming, and camping.

See also
List of West Virginia rivers

References

Rivers of West Virginia
Tributaries of the Ohio River
Rivers of Wayne County, West Virginia